Naked Hearts is a 1916 American silent drama film directed by Rupert Julian and starring Francelia Billington, Jack Holt, and Zoe Rae.

Cast
 Francelia Billington as Maud 
 Rupert Julian as Cecil 
 Zoe Rae as Maud, as a Child 
 Gordon Griffith as Cecil, as a Child 
 Douglas Gerrard as Lord Lovelace 
 Jack Holt as Howard 
 George Hupp as Howard, as a Child 
 Nanine Wright as Cecil's Mother
 Ben Horning as Maud's Father 
 Paul Weigel as Cecil's Father

Preservation
With no copies listed as being in any film archive,  Naked Hearts is a lost film.

References

Bibliography
 Larry Langman & David Ebner. Hollywood's Image of the South: A Century of Southern Films. Greenwood Publishing Group, 2001.

External links

1916 films
1916 drama films
1910s English-language films
American silent feature films
Silent American drama films
Films directed by Rupert Julian
American black-and-white films
Universal Pictures films
1916 directorial debut films
Films based on works by Alfred, Lord Tennyson
Films based on poems
1910s American films